Richland is a village in Kalamazoo County in the U.S. state of Michigan. The population was 751 at the 2010 census, up from 593 at the 2000 census.

Geography

Demographics

2010 census
As of the census of 2010, there were 751 people, 347 households, and 221 families living in the village. The racial makeup of the village was 94.7% White, 0.4% African American, 1.2% Asian, 0.3% from other races, and 3.5% from two or more races. Hispanic or Latino of any race were 1.5% of the population.

There were 347 households, of which 24.8% had children under the age of 18 living with them, 52.4% were married couples living together, 8.9% had a female householder with no husband present, 2.3% had a male householder with no wife present, and 36.3% were non-families. 33.7% of all households were made up of individuals, and 19.6% had someone living alone who was 65 years of age or older. The average household size was 2.16 and the average family size was 2.75.

The median age in the village was 46.8 years. 21.6% of residents were under the age of 18; 4.1% were between the ages of 18 and 24; 20.9% were from 25 to 44; 31.4% were from 45 to 64; and 22.1% were 65 years of age or older. The gender makeup of the village was 43.9% male and 56.1% female.

2000 census
As of the census of 2000, there were 593 people, 258 households, and 170 families living in the village. The racial makeup of the village was 96.29% White, 0.17% African American, 0.17% Native American, 1.35% Asian, 0.17% from other races, and 1.85% from two or more races. Hispanic or Latino of any race were 1.52% of the population.

There were 258 households, out of which 29.5% had children under the age of 18 living with them, 54.7% were married couples living together, 8.1% had a female householder with no husband present, and 34.1% were non-families. 29.5% of all households were made up of individuals, and 14.3% had someone living alone who was 65 years of age or older. The average household size was 2.30 and the average family size was 2.84.

In the village, the population was spread out, with 24.6% under the age of 18, 5.1% from 18 to 24, 26.8% from 25 to 44, 26.3% from 45 to 64, and 17.2% who were 65 years of age or older. The median age was 43 years. For every 100 females, there were 80.2 males. For every 100 females age 18 and over, there were 78.1 males.

The median income for a household in the village was $50,938, and the median income for a family was $58,542. Males had a median income of $42,250 versus $30,956 for females. The per capita income for the village was $23,777. About 1.2% of families and 1.4% of the population were below the poverty line, including none of those under age 18 and 7.5% of those age 65 or over.

History
Richland is located in the middle of what was once the Gull Prairie, an upland area relatively free of trees and maintained by natural and man-made fires. The area had a few Pottawatamie villages, one was located on the west side of nearby Gull Lake. Fish and game were plentiful, and the land was very fertile. Since there were few trees to clear, the prairie was among the first areas of Kalamazoo County to be settled. By the 1830s, the Native Americans had been forced west, and Richland was a thriving frontier village. The village even contended with Prairie Ronde for the county seat, but the centrally-located village of Bronson (now Kalamazoo) was ultimately chosen.

Lacking a flowing stream that would have provided water power, Richland never developed significant industry and remained a sleepy farm community until the late twentieth century. In the 1980s and 1990s, small employers such as Richard Allen Medical moved to the edge of town, and Richland became a bedroom community for Kalamazoo. The high quality of the local Gull Lake School District also drew people from surrounding areas. New subdivisions were built in what had been hilly farm country.

Brothers Charles S. May and Dwight May, both lieutenant governors of Michigan during the 19th Century, were raised in Richland.

Notable people

Education
Richland Elementary School
Thomas M. Ryan Intermediate School
Gull Lake Middle School
Gull Lake High School
The Montessori School - Preschool
Vineyard Academy

References

External links

Villages in Kalamazoo County, Michigan
Villages in Michigan
Kalamazoo–Portage metropolitan area